The International English Language Testing System (IELTS ), is an international standardized test of English language proficiency for non-native English language speakers. It is jointly managed by the British Council, IDP: IELTS Australia and Cambridge Assessment English, and was established in 1989. IELTS is one of the major English-language tests in the world.

IELTS is accepted by most Australian, British, Canadian, European, Irish and New Zealand academic institutions, by over 3,000 academic institutions in the United States, and by various professional organisations across the world.

IELTS is approved by UK Visas and Immigration (UKVI) as a Secure English Language Test for visa applicants both outside and inside the UK. It also meets requirements for immigration to Australia, where Test of English as a Foreign Language (TOEFL) and Pearson Test of English Academic are also accepted, and New Zealand. In Canada, IELTS, TEF, or CELPIP are accepted by the immigration authority.

No minimum score is required to pass the test. An IELTS result or Test Report Form is issued to all test takers with a score from "band 1" ("non-user") to "band 9" ("expert user") and each institution sets a different threshold. There is also a "band 0" score for those who did not attempt the test. Institutions are advised not to consider a report older than two years to be valid, unless the user proves that they have worked to maintain their level.

In 2017, over 3 million tests were taken in more than 140 countries, up from 2 million tests in 2012, 1.7 million tests in 2011 and 1.4 million tests in 2009. In 2007, IELTS administered more than one million tests in a single 12-month period for the first time ever, making it the world's most popular English language test for higher education and immigration.

In 2019, over 508,000 international students came to study in the UK, making it the world's most popular UK ELT destination. Over half (54%) of those students were under-18 years old.

History

The English Language Testing Service (IELTS), as IELTS was then known, was launched in 1980 by Cambridge English Language Assessment (then known as UCLES) and the British Council. It had an innovative format, which reflected changes in language learning and teaching, including the growth in 'communicative' language learning and 'English for specific purposes'. Test tasks were intended to reflect the use of English language in the 'real world'.

During the 1980s, test taker numbers were low (4,000 in 1981 rising to 10,000 in 1985) and there were practical difficulties administering the test. As a result, the IELTS Revision Project was set up to oversee the redesign of the test. In order to have international participation in the redesign, the International Development Program of Australian Universities and Colleges (IDP), now known as IDP: IELTS Australia, joined Cambridge English Language Assessment and the British Council to form the international IELTS partnership which delivers the test to this day. This international partnership was reflected in the new name for the test: The International English Language Testing System (IELTS).

IELTS went live in 1989. Test takers took two non-specialised modules, Listening and Speaking, and two specialised modules, Reading and Writing. Test taker numbers rose by approximately 15% per year and by 1995 there were 43,000 test takers in 210 test centres around the world.

IELTS was revised again in 1995, with three main changes:
 There was one Academic Reading Module and one Academic Writing Module (previously there had been a choice of three field-specific Reading and Writing modules)
 The thematic link between the Reading and Writing tasks was removed to avoid confusing the assessment of reading and writing ability
 The General Training Reading and Writing modules were brought into line with the Academic Reading and Writing modules (same timing, length of responses, reporting of scores).

Further revisions went live in 2001 (revised Speaking Test) and 2005 (new assessment criteria for the Writing test).

IELTS characteristics

IELTS Academic and IELTS General Training are designed to cover the full range of abilities from non-user to expert user. The Academic version is for test takers who want to study at the tertiary level in an English-speaking country or seek professional registration. The General Training version is for test takers who want to work, train, study at a secondary school or migrate to an English-speaking country.

The difference between the Academic and General Training versions is the content, context, and purpose of the tasks. All other features, such as timing allocation, length of written responses, and reporting of scores, are the same.

IELTS Academic and General Training both incorporate the following features:
 IELTS tests the ability to listen, read, write and speak in English.
 The speaking module is a key component of IELTS. It is conducted in the form of a one-to-one interview with an examiner. The examiner assesses the test taker as he or she is speaking. The speaking session is also recorded for monitoring and for re-marking in case of an appeal against the score given
 A variety of accents and writing styles have been presented in test materials in order to minimize linguistic bias. The accents in the listening section are generally 80% British, Australian, New Zealander and 20% others (mostly American).
 IELTS is developed by experts at Cambridge English Language Assessment with input from item writers from around the world. Teams are located in the US, UK, Australia, New Zealand, Canada, and other English-speaking nations.
 Band scores are used for each language sub-skill (Listening, Reading, Writing, and Speaking). The Band Scale ranges from 0 ("Did not attempt the test") to 9 ("Expert User").

IELTS test structure

Modules 
There are two modules of the IELTS:
 Academic Module and
 General Training Module
There's also a separate test offered by the IELTS test partners, called IELTS Life Skills:

 IELTS Academic is intended for those who want to enroll in universities and other institutions of higher education and for professionals such as medical doctors and nurses who want to study or practise in an English-speaking country.
 IELTS General Training is intended for those planning to undertake non-academic training or to gain work experience, or for immigration purposes.
 IELTS Life Skills is intended for those who need to prove their English speaking and listening skills at Common European Framework of Reference for Languages (CEFR) levels A1 or B1 and can be used to apply for a ‘family of a settled person’ visa, indefinite leave to remain or citizenship in the UK.

The four parts of the IELTS test 
 Listening: 30 minutes (plus 10 minutes' transfer time)
 Reading: 60 minutes
 Writing: 60 minutes
 Speaking: 11–14 minutes

The total test time is: 2 hours and 45 minutes.

Listening, Reading and Writing are completed in one sitting. The Speaking test may be taken on the same day or up to seven days before or after the other tests.

All test takers take the same Listening and Speaking tests, while the Reading and Writing tests differ depending on whether the test taker is taking the Academic or General Training  versions of the test.

Listening
The module comprises four sections, with ten questions in each section.It takes 40 minutes: 30 - for testing, plus 10 for transferring the answers to an answer sheet.

Sections 1 and 2 are about everyday, social situations.
 Section 1 has a conversation between two speakers (for example, a conversation about travel arrangements)
 Section 2 has one person speaking (for example, a speech about local facilities).

Sections 3 and 4 are about educational and training situations
 Section 3 is a conversation between two main speakers (for example, a discussion between two university students, perhaps guided by a tutor)
 Section 4 has one person speaking about an academic subject.

Each section begins with a short introduction telling the test taker about the situation and the speakers. Then they have some time to look through the questions. The questions are in the same order as the information in the recording, so the answer to the first question will be before the answer to the second question, and so on. The first three sections have a break in the middle allowing test takers to look at the remaining questions. Each section is heard only once.

At the end of the test students are given 10 minutes to transfer their answers to an answer sheet. Test takers will lose marks for incorrect spelling and grammar.

Reading

The Reading paper has three sections and texts totalling 2,150-2,750 words. There will be a variety of question types, such as multiple-choice, short-answer questions, identifying information, identifying writer's views, labelling diagrams, completing a summary using words taken from the text and matching information/headings/features in the text/sentence endings. Test takers should be careful when writing down their answers as they will lose marks for incorrect spelling and grammar.

Texts in IELTS Academic
 Three reading texts, which come from books, journals, magazines, newspapers and online resources written for non-specialist audiences. All the topics are of general interest to students at undergraduate or postgraduate level.

Texts in IELTS General Training
 Section 1 contains two or three short texts or several shorter texts, which deal with everyday topics. For example, timetables or notices – things a person would need to understand when living in an English-speaking country. 
 Section 2 contains two texts, which deal with work. For example, job descriptions, contracts, training materials.
 Section 3 contains one long text about a topic of general interest. The text is generally descriptive, longer and more complex than the texts in Sections 1 and 2. The text will be taken from a newspaper, magazine, book or online resource.

Writing

The Writing paper has two tasks which must both be completed. In task 1 test takers write at least 150 words in about 20 minutes. In task 2 test takers write at least 250 words in about 40 minutes. Test takers will be penalised if their answer is too short or does not relate to the topic. Answers should be written in full sentences (test takers must not use notes or bullet points).

IELTS Academic
 Task 1: test takers describe a graph, table, chart, map, process, pie chart or diagram in their own words.
 Task 2: test takers discuss a point of view, argument, or problem. Depending on the task, test takers may be required to present a solution to a problem, present and justify an opinion, compare and contrast evidence, opinions and implications, and evaluate and challenge ideas, evidence or an argument.

IELTS General Training
 Task 1: test takers write a letter in response to a given everyday situation. For example, writing to an accommodation officer about problems with your accommodation, writing to a new employer about problems managing your time, or writing to a local newspaper about a plan to develop a local airport.
 Task 2: test takers write an essay about a topic of general interest. For example, whether smoking should be banned in public places, whether children's leisure activities should be educational, or how environmental problems can be solved.

Speaking

The speaking test is a face-to-face interview between the test taker and an examiner.

The speaking test contains three sections. 
 Section 1: introduction and interview (4–5 minutes). Test takers may be asked about their home, family, work, studies, hobbies, interests, reasons for taking IELTS exam, and other general topics such as clothing, free time, computers, and the Internet. 
 Section 2: long turn (3–4 minutes). Test takers are given a task card about a particular topic. Test takers have one minute to prepare to talk about this topic. The task card states the points that should be included in the talk and one aspect of the topic which must be explained during the talk. Test takers are then expected to talk about the topic for one to two minutes, after which the examiner may ask one or two questions.
 Section 3: discussions (4–5 minutes). The third section involves a discussion between the examiner and the test taker, generally on questions relating to the theme which they have already spoken about in Section 2. These questions usually consist of two sets of four or five questions.

Scoring

Test takers receive a score for each test component – Listening, Reading, Writing, and Speaking. The individual scores are then averaged and rounded to produce an Overall Band Score.

Band scale

There is no pass or fail. IELTS is scored on a nine-band scale, with each band corresponding to a specified competence in English. Overall Band Scores are reported to the nearest half band.

The following rounding convention applies: if the average across the four skills ends in .25, it is rounded up to the next half band, and if it ends in .75, it is rounded up to the next whole band.

The nine bands are described as follows:

IELTS and the CEFR

Conversion table

This table can be used to convert raw scores (out of 40) to band scores (out of 9). This helps test takers understand how many correct answers they need to achieve a particular band score. This chart is only a guide; scores may vary slightly depending on how difficult the test is.

Results

For a computer-delivered test, results are released between 3–5 days. For a paper-based test, a Test Report Form is posted to test takers 13 days after their test. It shows:
 An Overall Band Score (from 1–9)
 A band score (from 1–9) for each section of the test (Listening, Reading, Writing, and Speaking)
 Whether IELTS Academic or General Training was completed
 The test taker's photo, nationality, first language and date of birth

Test takers receive one copy of their Test Report Form, apart from test takers who are applying to the Department of Citizenship and Immigration Canada (CIC) or UK Visas and Immigration (UKVI) who receive two copies.

Test Report Forms are valid for two years.

Locations and test dates

Test takers can take IELTS in more than 140 countries and in over 1,600 locations.

There are up to 48 test dates available per year. Each test centre offers tests up to four times a month depending on local demand. The Academic version is available on all 48 dates per year and the General Training version is available on 24 dates.

There used to be a minimum time limit of 90 days before a person was allowed to retake the test. However this restriction has been withdrawn and currently there is no limit for applicants to retake the test.

Linking IELTS Scores to TOEFL iBT Score Ranges

Linking IELTS Bands to PTE-A Scores

Global test scores

In 2019, approximately 77% of test takers took the Academic version and 23% of test takers took the General Training version. The average overall score in the Academic version was 6.04 for male test takers and 6.10 for female test takers. In the General Training version, it was 6.57 for male test takers and 6.63 female test takers.

Countries with highest average scores (Academic)

In 2019, of the 40 most common places of origin, the countries ranked in the top five for mean band scores for the Academic IELTS test were:

Countries with highest average scores (General Training)

In 2018, of the 40 most common places of origin, the countries ranked in the top five for mean band scores for the General Training IELTS test were:

Results by first language of test taker (Academic)

In 2019, of the 40 most common self-reported first language backgrounds, the countries ranked in the top five in the Academic IELTS test were from test takers whose first languages were:

Results by first language of test taker (General Training)

In 2019, of the 40 most common self-reported first language backgrounds, the countries ranked in the top five in the General Training IELTS test were from test takers whose first languages were:

Level required by academic institutions for admission
Just over half (51%) of test takers take IELTS to enter higher education in a foreign country. The IELTS minimum scores required by academic institutions and by course vary. As a general rule, the top ranked universities in the United States tend to require a higher IELTS band (typically 7.0). Most universities accept scores between 6-7 as being suitable for undergraduate study in English.

IELTS is used by over 9,000 educational institutions worldwide. This section provides just a few examples of IELTS requirements in different countries. Full details about the organizations which accept IELTS and the scores they require can be found on the IELTS Global Recognition System .

United States
IELTS is accepted by over 3,000 U.S. institutions. The highest IELTS Band required by a university is 8.5, by the Graduate School of Journalism at Columbia University.

Most top ranked U.S. universities, as listed by the TES 2015 World University Rankings, require a minimum score of around 7.0. For example:

United Kingdom
Most top ranked UK universities, as listed by the THE 2020 World University Rankings, require a minimum score of 6.5-7.0. For example:

Canada

IELTS is accepted by over 750 organisations in Canada Most top ranked Canadian universities, as listed by the TES 2015 World University Rankings, require a minimum score of 6.5 with a minimum subscore of 6.0 for each individual part.

Australia
Most top ranked Australian universities, as listed by the TES 2015 World University Rankings, require a minimum score of approximately 6.5. For example:

Along with the universities, the test results are directly relevant for applying a student Visa (Subclass 500). The candidates need at least an IELTS score of 5.5. The precise requirements depend on the university.

Hong Kong

Non-native English speaking countries
Most top ranked universities in non-native English speaking countries, as listed by the TES 2015 World University Rankings, require a minimum score between 6.0 and 7.0 For example:

IELTS use for immigration purposes

A number of Commonwealth countries use IELTS scores as a proof of prospective immigrants' competence in English.

Australia
Australia's immigration authorities have used IELTS to assess English proficiency of prospective migrants since May 1998, when this test replaced the 'access:' test that had been previously used.

There are different IELTS score requirements for different types of visa.

New Zealand
New Zealand has used the IELTS test since 1995. There are different IELTS score requirements for different types of visa and type of applicant.

Originally, applicants who could not achieve the required score could pay a NZ$20,000 fee instead, which would be fully or partially refunded later if the migrant were able to successfully take the test within a certain period (3 to 12 months) after his or her arrival to the country. A few years later, the policy was changed: the fee was reduced, and, instead of being potentially refundable, it became treated as a "pre-purchase" of post-arrival ESL tuition.

Canada
Citizenship and Immigration Canada (CIC) uses IELTS and/or TEF as evidence of one's ability to communicate in English and/or French. The CELPIP (Canadian English Language Proficiency Index Program) test scores are an alternative to IELTS.

The Canadian Language Benchmarks (CLB) are the national standards used in Canada for describing, measuring and recognizing the English language proficiency of prospective immigrants. The following table shows the IELTS scores needed for each CLB level.

There are different language requirements for different types of immigration program as shown below:

Submitting one's IELTS scores is also one of the several ways to prove one's proficiency in an official language when applying for Canadian citizenship (minimum of CLB level 4 required).

United Kingdom
On 6 April 2015, UK Visas and Immigration (UKVI) changed its English language requirements for UK visa and immigration applications.

IELTS assesses all four language skills and is accepted by UK Visas and Immigration (UKVI) at levels B1 to C2 of the Common European Framework of Reference for Languages (CEFR).

A new test, IELTS Life Skills, assesses Speaking and Listening at CEFR level A1 and at CEFR Level B1. IELTS Life Skills can be used to meet the English language requirements for some classes of visa application, including 'family of a settled person' visas and indefinite leave and citizenship.

To be used for visa and immigration purposes, IELTS and IELTS Life Skills must be taken in test centres approved by the UKVI.

For UK visa purposes the test is designed to meet certain administrative requirements specified by UKVI. These Test Report Forms are slightly different, to show that the test taker has taken the test at an IELTS UKVI session. The actual test taken is the same – same content, examiners, format, level of difficulty, scoring and so on.

Other English proficiency tests
 ACTFL Assessment of Progress toward Proficiency in Languages (AAPPL)
 Cambridge English Language Assessment
 Cambridge English: Advanced (CAE)
 Cambridge English: First
 Cambridge English: Proficiency (CPE)
 CAEL, Canadian Academic English Language Assessment
 CELPIP, Canadian English Language Proficiency Index Program
 Chulalongkorn University Test of English Proficiency (CU-TEP)
 EF Standard English Test, an open-access standardized English test
 Duolingo English Test
 Examination for the Certificate of Proficiency in English (ECPE), the Examination for the Certificate of Proficiency in English
 ITEP, International Test of English Proficiency.
 MUET, Malaysian University English Test
 OPI, OPIc
 Oxford Test of English
 PTE Academic - The Pearson Test of English
 Saudi Standardized Test for English Proficiency (STEP)
 STEP Eiken, Test of English
 TELC, The European Language Certificates
 TOEFL, Test of English as a Foreign Language
 TOEIC, Test of English for International Communication
 TrackTest, English Proficiency Test Online (CEFR-based)
 Trinity College London ESOL
 TSE, Test of Spoken English
 University of Bath English Language Test (UBELT)

See also
 English as a Foreign or Second Language
 International Student Admissions Test (ISAT)
 List of admissions tests
 National Accreditation Authority for Translators and Interpreters (NAATI)
 Teaching English as a foreign language (TEFL)

References

External links

 Official website
 Official Guide to IELTS
 IELTS, British Council

1980 introductions
Standardized tests for English language
English-language education
British Council
University of Cambridge examinations